Ildikó is a Hungarian feminine given name of Germanic origin; its original Germanic version is Ilda or Hilda.  Its meaning is "battle" or "warrior" in ancient Germanic languages. Its medieval Latin version was Ildico, which the Hungarians adopted later as Ildikó.

Notable persons with that name
Ildico ( 5th century AD), Ostrogoth princess, who was accused of poisoning king Attila the Hun during their wedding night.
Ildikó Bánsági (born 1947), Hungarian actress
Ildikó Enyedi (born 1955), Hungarian filmmaker
Ildikó Erdélyi (born 1955), Hungarian long jumper
Ildikó Keresztes, Hungarian singer and actress, see Hungary in the Eurovision Song Contest 2013
Ildikó Kishonti (1947–2009), Hungarian actress
Ildikó Mádl (born 1969), Hungarian chess player
Ildikó Marosi (1932–2020), Romanian journalist
Ildikó Pécsi (1940–2020), Hungarian actress
Ildikó Schwarczenberger (1951–2015), Hungarian foil fencer
Ildikó Tóth (born 1966), Hungarian actress
Ildikó Újlaky-Rejtő (born 1937), Hungarian Olympic and world champion foil fencer

Hungarian feminine given names